J-FRIENDS was a special unit made up of Johnny & Associates groups TOKIO, V6, and KinKi Kids. It was formed in 1997 to raise money for schools affected by the Great Hanshin earthquake in 1995. Until their disbandment in 2003 they were able to release 6 singles and held some charity concerts and events. In the end they were able to donate 836,951,855 yen.

History
In 1995, there was a big earthquake in Hanshin and Awaji in Japan. About 6,500 people were dead and 513,000 houses were crushed. To help such people, in 1998, KinKi Kids, along with fellow Johnny's groups V6 and TOKIO, came together to form a special charity-oriented group called J-FRIENDS, they sang songs to raise the money for Hanshin and Awaji earthquake victims especially for children, in which all the songs are created and being produced by many famous international musicians such as Michael Jackson, Maurice White, Diane Warren, Elton John, Jon Bon Jovi, and Koshi Inaba. J-Friends's first single , released on January 21, 1998, went on to sell over a million copies and ranked 12th on the annual Oricon charts by the end of the year.

Discography

EPs

Singles

Videos

References

Johnny & Associates
Japanese boy bands
Japanese idol groups
Japanese pop music groups
Musical groups from Tokyo
Musical groups established in 1997
Musical groups disestablished in 2003
Charity supergroups